This is a list of years in Estonia.

20th century

21st century

See also
 Timeline of Estonian history
List of years by country

 
Estonia history-related lists
Estonia